Brachytoma tuberosa is a species of sea snail, a marine gastropod mollusk in the family Pseudomelatomidae.

Description
The length of the shell attains 18 mm.

Distribution
This species occurs in China seas and off Japan and the Philippines.

References

 Liu J.Y. [Ruiyu] (ed.). (2008). Checklist of marine biota of China seas. China Science Press. 1267 pp

External links
 
 
 Inquisitor tuberosa (Smith, 1875) in Lai K (2017). The National Checklist of Taiwan. Taiwan Biodiversity Information Facility (TaiBIF)

tuberosa
Gastropods described in 1875